Neighborhood Records (Neighborhood Music Pub. Corp.) was a record label founded by Melanie Safka and her husband Peter Schekeryk in 1971.  The label's biggest hit was her #1 single "Brand New Key".

First distributed by the Famous Music group of record labels (i.e. Dot, Blue Thumb and Paramount), it shifted distribution to Bell/Arista before folding in 1975.

There is also an independent record label by the same name that was founded by M.A. Sotelo in 2006. Its recordings were first distributed by Scrub Records and distribution later shifted to Kunaki, LLC.

See also 
 List of record labels

Defunct record labels of the United States
Record labels established in 1971
Pop record labels
1971 establishments in the United States
1975 disestablishments in the United States
Record labels disestablished in 1975